The men's 97 kg powerlifting event at the 2016 Summer Paralympics was contested on 14 September at Riocentro.

Records 
There are twenty powerlifting events, corresponding to ten weight classes each for men and women. The weight categories were significantly adjusted after the 2012 Games so most of the weights are new for 2016. As a result, no Paralympic record was available for this weight class prior to the competition. The existing world records were as follows.

Results

References 

Men's 097 kg